Pu Thuam Hang (born 1870), chief of Khuasak, was one of the first Christian convert among the Zomi (Chin) in Chin State, Burma.

Reverend Arthur E. Carlson and Mrs. Laura Carlson, Swedish-American Baptist missionaries, came to Hakha, Chin State, Burma, in 1899. This couple sent a Kayin pastor named Saya Shwe Zan to Khuasak, to preach about Christianity, as they had heard that the Sizang people could understand the Burmese language. Pu Thuam Hang was at first reluctant to convert, as he was concerned over the resulting loss of social and economic status. Two of his sons suffered from illnesses; after one was cured by Dr. Eric Hjalmar East, and the other apparently miraculously, Pu Thuam Hang was converted. Dr. East baptized Pu Thuam Hang and Thuam Hang's wife on May 15, 1905 along with the first Chin Christian converted Pu Pau Suan. Pu Pau Suan received Jesus Christ as his personal savior and his wife Pi Kham Ciang converted on July 10,1904. Pu Thuam Hang was later ordained.

References

External links
www.emchurch.org
www.burmalibrary.org
amazingforums.com

People from Chin State
Burmese Baptists
Converts to Christianity
Burmese people of Chin descent
1870 births
Year of death missing